Zhang Zizhong (August 11, 1891 – May 16, 1940) was a general of the Chinese National Revolutionary Army (NRA) during the Second Sino-Japanese War. Born in Linqing, Shandong, he was the highest-ranked officer and the only Army group commander of the NRA to die in the war. He was killed-in-action during the Battle of Yichang after refusing to retreat from the front lines. He showed great valor in the field and was regarded as one of the most valiant and respectable Chinese generals by the Imperial Japanese Army during the Second Sino-Japanese War. Because he was lieutenant general with the effective rank of full general at the time of his death, and was posthumously promoted to full general, he was also one of the highest-ranked Allied officers killed in action in World War II. His mausoleum is situated in Beibei District, Chongqing.  There are roads named after him in Shanghai, Beijing, Tianjin and Wuhan.

Career timeline
 1911: Studied law in Tianjin
 1914: Assigned to the 20th Army Division near Fengtian (present day Shenyang) as platoon leader
 1935–1936: Chairman of the Government of Chahar Province
 1937: Mayor of Tianjin
 1937: General Officer Commanding 38th Division
 1937–1940: General Officer Commanding LIX Corps
 1938: General Officer commanding the 27th Army
 1939: Commander in Chief Right Flank Army 5th War Area
 1939–1940 : Commander in Chief 33rd Army Group
 1940: Killed in Action at Mount Chang near Yichang, Hubei
 1940: Posthumous promotion to Full General

Death
General Zhang Zizhong, commander of the eight divisions that constituted the Chinese 33rd Army Group, was killed at approximately 4:00 P.M. on May 16, 1940, in fighting at Shilichangshan (‘Ten li mountain’) near Nanguadian in Northern Hubei. The battle was one engagement of the Zaoyang-Yichang campaign that rumbled through late spring of that year. Surrounded by the Japanese, his forces had refused either to retreat or to surrender. In the ensuing hand-to-hand combat, General Zhang had been wounded seven times in all, by grenade, bullet, and finally by bayonet. The victorious Japanese realized Zhang's identity only when a major discovered, in the left breast pocket of his blood-soaked yellow uniform, a fine gold pen engraved with his name. The major quickly summoned senior officers; they ordered a stretcher brought and the body was carried away from the battlefield. (This was observed, through half-opened eyes, by Zhang's long-time associate, the Chinese major Ma Xiaotang, who lay nearby, bleeding from a bayonet wound, and who later gasped out the story to Chinese as he died).

See also
Military history of China
History of the Republic of China
Kuomintang
Second Sino-Japanese War
World War II
Marco Polo Bridge Incident
Battle of Tai'erzhuang
Battle of Wuhan

References

Further reading 
 Arthur Waldron. "China's New Remembering of World War II: The Case of Zhang Zizhong". Modern Asian Studies 30, 4 (1996): 945–978.

External links
A memorial site for Zhang Zizhong (in Simplified Chinese)
A commemorative site in English for Zhang Zizhong

National Revolutionary Army generals from Shandong
People of the Northern Expedition
People of the Central Plains War
Mayors of Tianjin
People from Liaocheng
1891 births
1940 deaths
Military personnel of the Republic of China killed in the Second Sino-Japanese War
Recipients of the Order of Blue Sky and White Sun
Burials in Chongqing